Lajos Kolozsváry (1871–1937) was a Hungarian Painter whose works were exhibited in the Műcsarnok (Art Gallery).

References 

1871 births
1937 deaths
20th-century Hungarian painters
Hungarian male painters
20th-century Hungarian male artists